Edward Welby Pugin (11 March 1834 – 5 June 1875) was an English architect, the eldest son of architect Augustus Welby Northmore Pugin and Louisa Barton and part of the Pugin & Pugin family of church architects. His father was an architect and designer of Neo-Gothic architecture, and after his death in 1852 Edward took up his successful practice. At the time of his own early death in 1875, Pugin had designed and completed more than one hundred Catholic churches.

He was influenced by the neo-Gothic of Viollet-le-Duc, in which expansive spatial planning was combined with great detail.

He designed churches and cathedrals primarily in the British Isles. However, commissions for his exemplary work were also received from countries throughout Western Europe, Scandinavia and as far away as North America.

Works in Ireland 
SS Peter and Paul's, Carey's Lane, Cork (1859)
Edermine, Enniscorthy, County Wexford (c. 1858)
Cobh Cathedral (1867)
Killarney Cathedral
Fermoy Roman Catholic Church, County Cork (1867)
Drogheda Christian Brothers Residence (currently Scholars Townhouse Hotel (1867)
Crosshaven Roman Catholic Church, County Cork (1869)
Monkstown Roman Catholic Church, County Dublin (1866)
Monkstown Roman Catholic Church, County Cork (1866)
Convent of Mercy, Skibbereen, County Cork (1867)
Convent of Mercy, Birr, County Offaly
John's Lane Church, Dublin
Attributed to:
AIB bank, Midleton
Midleton Arms
Church and Convent, Ramsgrange, County Wexford
Bellevue Roman Catholic Church, County Wexford
Mercy Convent, Pearce St, Nenagh County Tipperary

Works in England 

 St. Patrick's Wolverhampton (demolished)
1853: Our Lady Immaculate and St Cuthbert, Crook, Co Durham
1856: Shrewsbury Cathedral, the Cathedral Church of Our Lady Help of Christians and Saint Peter of Alcantara, Town Walls, Shrewsbury (built as a cathedral)
1856: Our Lady Immaculate, St. Domingo Road, Everton, Liverpool. Demolished. Lady Chapel of scheme for Liverpool Cathedral
1856: St. Vincent de Paul, St. James Street, Liverpool
1857: Holy Cross, Croston, Lancashire. Small estate church
1857: Sacred Heart Church, Blackpool
1857–58: Our Lady of the Annunciation Church, Liverpool
1857–59: Our Lady and St. Hubert, Great Harwood, Lancashire
1858: St Peter's School, Woolwich
1859: Belmont Abbey, Hereford, Herefordshire (the Abbey Church was built as the pro-Cathedral for Wales)
1860: Octagonal Chapter House, Mount Saint Bernard Abbey, Leicestershire
1859–60: Our Lady of la Salette, Liverpool
1860: St. Mary Immaculate, Warwick
1860–61: St. Anne, Westby, Kirkham, Lancashire
1861: St. Edward, Thurloe Street, Rusholme, Manchester
1861–65: St. Michael, West Derby Road, Everton, Liverpool
1862: St. Anne, Chester Road, Stretford, near Manchester
1862: St Austin, Wolverhampton Road, Stafford
1863: St. Peter, Greengate, Salford, Lancashire
1863: SS Henry and Elizabeth, Sheerness, Kent
1863: Convent of Our Lady of Charity and Refuge, Bartestree, Herefordshire  (Subsequently, converted to flats)
1863: St Joseph, Bolton Road, Anderton, Chorley, Lancashire
1863-64: Monument to Everard Aloysius Lisle Phillipps, VC, Cademan Wood, Whitwick, Leicestershire 
1864: Our Lady and All Saints, New Road, Stourbridge, Worcestershire
1864: St. Marie, Lugsdale Road, Widnes, Cheshire (redundant)
1864: Our Lady of Redemption, Wellesley Road, Croydon
1864: St. Hubert, Dunsop Bridge, Yorkshire
1864-66: Augustinian Priory, school and Church of St Monica, Hoxton Square, London, N1
1865: St. Mary, Euxton, Lancashire
1865: St. Catherine, Kingsdown, Kent
1865–66: Mayfield Boys' Orphanage (later Mayfield College, from 2007 converted to residential apartments as Mayfield Grange), Mayfield, Sussex
1865–67: St. Joseph, York Road, Birkdale, Southport, Lancashire
1866: Euxton Hall Chapel, Euxton, near Chorley, Lancashire
1866: St Francis Monastery, Gorton, Manchester
1866: Our Blessed Lady and St. Joseph, Leadgate, Durham
1866: Chancel and transepts to Mount St Mary's Church, Leeds
1866–68: Meanwood Towers, Meanwood, Leeds
1866–67: St Mary's Church, Barrow-in-Furness, Lancashire
1866–67: St Michael and All Angels, Mortuary Chapel and Knill Memorial, Brockley Cemetery, London, destroyed by bombing in 1944
1866–67: Church of St Thomas of Canterbury and the English Martyrs, Preston, Lancashire, (extended in 1887–88)
1866-67: The Chapel of the Immaculate Conception, Ratcliffe College [Ratcliffe on the Wreake, Leicestershire], converted for school use in 1962 on the completion of a new, larger chapel [Norris].
1867: St Paul's Church, Dover, Kent
1867–68: St Mary, Fleetwood, Lancashire
1867–68: All Saints' Church in Urmston, Greater Manchester
1867–71: Our Lady and St Paulinus, Dewsbury, West Yorkshire
1868: St Begh, Coach Road, Whitehaven, Cumberland
1869–72: Our Lady of the Sacred Heart, Cleator, Cumberland
1869: St. Michael's Orphanage for Girls, aka St Joseph's College, Mark Cross, East Sussex
1869: Granville Hotel, Ramsgate, Kent
1871: Stanbrook Abbey, Powick, Worcestershire
1873: St Mary's Church, Brierley Hill
1875 Edward Welby Pugin dies
1875: St. Anne Rommer, Highfield Road, Rockferry, Birkenhead, Wirral, Cheshire designed by E. W. Pugin
1873–76: English Martyrs Church, 30 Prescot Street, London E1 
1876: Our Lady Star of the Sea, Workington. E. W. Pugin design
1877: Sacred Heart Church, Kilburn, London. E. W. Pugin design.
1877: St Mary's Church, Warrington, Cheshire. E. W. Pugin design

Works in Scotland 
1854 St Mary's Star of the Sea Church, Leith, Edinburgh
1856 St Stephen, Blairgowrie
1862: Church of St. Mary, Haddington
1874: Church of St Mary and St Finnan, Glenfinnan

Works in Wales 
 1857 Wrexham Cathedral: Cathedral of our Lady of Sorrows

Works on the Isle of Man 
 1865 St Patrick, Peel, Isle of Man

Works in Belgium (province of West Flanders) 
 1856 Basilica of Our Lady in Dadizele, finished off by Jean-Baptiste Bethune
 1856 Castle of Loppem, in collaboration with James Murray and George Ashlin, finished off by Jean-Baptiste Bethune
 1861 country estate near Bruges for bishop Joannes Baptista Malou, demolished

Works with James Murray (1856-c.1859)

Rugby Town Hall and Markets 

(1857). The old Town Hall stood on the High Street. It was built in 1857, with an extension in 1919. The upper floor became a cinema (Vint's Palace) around 1913. A bad fire destroyed most of the building in 1921 and it was rebuilt as Woolworths, which opened in 1923 and closed in 2009.

Works in association with George Ashlin 

 Ss Peter and Paul's, Cork, (1859)
 Convent of Mercy, Clonakilty, County Cork (1867)
 Convent and Orphanage, William Street North, Dublin (1867)
 SS Augustine and John, Thomas Street, Dublin (1860)
Regarded as Dublin's finest Victorian church, SS Augustine and John (John's Lane Church) in the Liberties area was designed by E.W. Pugin and executed by his partner George Ashlin for the Augustinian Fathers. It was built between 1862 and 1895. It has the tallest spire in Dublin (231 ft), and occupies a prominent position on high ground overlooking the Liffey Valley. It has a striking polychromatic appearance, being built in granite with red sandstone dressings.

The eminent Gothic revivalist Ruskin is said to have praised it, describing it as a "poem in stone".

Statues of the apostles in the niches of the spire are by James Pearse, father of Padraig and Willie, who were executed after the 1916 Easter Rising.

There is some good stained glass from the Harry Clarke studios.
 Presentation Convent, Fethard, County Tipperary (1862)
 Harrington Street Catholic Church, Dublin (1867); online
 Donnybrook Catholic Church, Dublin (1863)
 Monkstown Catholic Church, Co. Dublin (1865)
 Arles Catholic Church, Stradbally, County Laois (1965)
 Ferrybank Catholic Church, Waterford (1867)
 Kilanerin Catholic Church, Wexford (1865)
 Lady's Island Catholic Church, Co. Wexford (1863)

Sources
Dictionary of Scottish Architects
 Jean van Cleven,  'The Eternal Château': bouwgeschiedenis en kunsthistorische analyse van het neogotische kasteel van Loppem, in V. van Caloen, J. van Cleven, J. Braet Het Kasteel van Loppem, Stichting Kunstboek, 2001.

References

Further reading 
 Michael Fisher, Pugin-Land: A W N Pugin, Lord Shrewsbury and the Gothic Revival in Staffordshire, Stafford Fisher, 2002.
 Rachel Hasted, Scarisbrick Hall – A Guide, Social History at Lancashire County Museum Service, 1984.
 Frederick O'Dwyer, Ecclesiastical Architecture from 1829 in W.J. McCormack (ed) Modern Irish Culture, Oxford:Blackwell, 2001.
 Frederick O'Dwyer, A Victorian Partnership – The Architecture of Pugin & Ashlin in John Graby (ed) 150 Years of Architecture in Ireland, Dublin, Eblana Editions, 1989.
 Jeanne Sheehy, The Rediscovery of Ireland's Past, The Celtic Revival 1830–1930. London 1980.

External links 

Pugin Society
E.W. Pugin buildings on Archiseek.com

1834 births
1875 deaths
19th-century English architects
Gothic Revival architects
English ecclesiastical architects
English Roman Catholics
English people of French descent
Knights of the Order of St. Sylvester
Architects of Roman Catholic churches
Architects of cathedrals
Artists' Rifles soldiers
EW
Architects from London